Postsynaptic potentials are changes in the membrane potential of the postsynaptic terminal of a chemical  synapse.  Postsynaptic potentials are  graded potentials, and should not be confused with action potentials although their function is to initiate or inhibit action potentials.  They are caused by the presynaptic neuron releasing neurotransmitters from the terminal bouton at the end of an axon into the synaptic cleft. The neurotransmitters bind to  receptors on the postsynaptic terminal, which may be a neuron or a muscle cell in the case of a neuromuscular junction. These are collectively referred to as postsynaptic receptors, since they are on the membrane of the postsynaptic cell.

The role of ions 

One way receptors can react to being bound by a neurotransmitter is to open or close an ion channel, allowing ions to enter or leave the cell. It is these ions that alter the membrane potential. Ions are subject to two main forces, diffusion and electrostatic repulsion. Ions will tend towards their equilibrium potential, which is the state where the diffusion force cancels out the force of electrostatic repulsion. When a membrane is at its equilibrium potential, there is no longer a net movement of ions. Two important equations that can determine membrane potential differences based on ion concentrations are the Nernst Equation and the Goldman Equation.

Relation to action potentials 

Neurons have a resting potential of about −70 mV. If the opening of the ion channel results in a net gain of positive charge across the membrane, the membrane is said to be depolarized, as the potential comes closer to zero. This is an excitatory postsynaptic potential (EPSP), as it brings the neuron's potential closer to its firing threshold (about −55 mV).  

If, on the other hand, the opening of the ion channel results in a net gain of negative charge, this moves the potential further from zero and is referred to as hyperpolarization. This is an inhibitory postsynaptic potential (IPSP), as it changes the charge across the membrane to be further from the firing threshold.

Neurotransmitters are not inherently excitatory or inhibitory: different receptors for the same neurotransmitter may open different types of ion channels. 

EPSPs and IPSPs are transient changes in the membrane potential, and EPSPs  resulting from transmitter release at a single synapse are generally far too small to trigger a spike in the postsynaptic neuron. However, a neuron may receive synaptic inputs from hundreds, if not thousands, of other neurons, with varying amounts of simultaneous input, so the combined activity of afferent neurons can cause large fluctuations in membrane potential or subthreshold membrane potential oscillations. If the postsynaptic cell is sufficiently depolarized, an action potential will occur. For example, in low-threshold spikes depolarizations by the T-type calcium channel occur at low, negative, membrane depolarizations resulting in the neuron reaching the threshold. Action potentials are not graded; they are all-or-none responses.

Termination 

Postsynaptic potentials begin to be terminated when the neurotransmitter detaches from its receptor. The receptor is then free to return to its previous structural state. Ion channels that had been opened by the receptor when the neurotransmitter was bound to it will now close. Once the channels are closed, ions return to their equilibrium states, and the membrane is returned to its equilibrium potential.

Algebraic summation 

Postsynaptic potentials are subject to summation, spatially and/or temporally.  

Spatial summation: If a cell is receiving input at two synapses that are near each other, their postsynaptic potentials add together. If the cell is receiving two excitatory postsynaptic potentials, they combine so that the membrane potential is depolarized by the sum of the two changes. If there are two inhibitory potentials, they also sum, and the membrane is hyperpolarized by that amount. If the cell is receiving both inhibitory and excitatory postsynaptic potentials, they can cancel out, or one can be stronger than the other, and the membrane potential will change by the difference between them.

Temporal summation: When a cell receives inputs that are close together in time, they are also added together, even if from the same synapse. Thus, if a neuron receives an excitatory postsynaptic potential, and then the presynaptic neuron fires again, creating another EPSP, then the membrane of the postsynaptic cell is depolarized by the total of the EPSPs.

See also
Action potential
Electrophysiology
Goldman equation
Membrane potential
Nernst equation
Neuron
Neurotransmission
Postsynaptic
Synapse
End-plate potential

External links

References

Neural synapse
Graded potentials